David Salanon (born 5 January 1974) is a French rally driver, who drives in the French Rally Championship. He won for the first time in 2007 and in 2015, he won the season-ending Rallye du Var for the first time, having finished in the runner-up position behind nine time World Rally Champion Sébastien Loeb last year.

He never put a foot wrong as his Ford Fiesta RS WRC finished every stage in the top six as well as winning all stages held on the second day. He maintained a lead that was held throughout.

External links

http://ewrc-results.com/profile.php?p=9176

Living people
1974 births
French rally drivers